Zagreb Zapadni kolodvor (Croatian for Zagreb West station) is a railway station in the city of Zagreb, Croatia.

The station opened in 1862, and was the city's main station until the opening of Zagreb Glavni railway station in 1892. The station was originally called Zagreb Južni kolodvor, or Agram Südbahnhof in German (Zagreb South station). In 1924 it was renamed Zagreb Sava, and in 1943 it received its current name Zagreb Zapadni.

The station has retained its original appearance, and has been protected as a cultural monument since 1986. The building was renovated in 2007.

References

External links

Railway stations opened in 1862
Railway stations in Croatia
Zapadni railway station
Zapadni railway station
1862 establishments in the Austrian Empire
Railway station (Zagreb - Zapadni)